The Vai–Kono languages, Vai and Kono, form a branch of the Mande languages spoken in Liberia and Sierra Leone. Extinct Dama is said to have been similar and thus may have been related.

References

Mande languages